Curtis Island is an island located in the exterior of Camden Harbor, in Camden, Maine. The island received its name in 1934 after Cyrus H. K. Curtis, publisher of the Saturday Evening Post, a long time resident and benefactor of Camden.

There is a lighthouse and caretaker's house on the southwestern point of the island. There are two paths around either side of the island and one open grassy path down the middle. The island light is depicted in the Fitz Henry Lane painting Lighthouse at Camden, Maine.

See also
 List of islands of Maine

References

 

Camden, Maine
Islands of Knox County, Maine
Islands of Maine
Coastal islands of Maine